The Kam Group is a  thick Archean volcanic group in the Yellowknife greenstone belt of the Northwest Territories, Canada. It consists of tholeiitic mafic and subordinate felsic volcanic rocks that were erupted in a submarine environment about 2706 million years ago.

See also
List of volcanoes in Canada
Volcanism of Canada
Volcanism of Northern Canada

References
Geochemistry of the Archean Kam Group, Yellowknife Greenstone Belt, Slave Province, Canada

Volcanic groups
Volcanoes of the Northwest Territories
Archean volcanism